The 1873 Oxford by-election was held on 6 December 1873.  The by-election was held due to William Vernon Harcourt, the incumbent Liberal MP, becoming the Solicitor General for England and Wales.  It was retained by Harcourt, who was unopposed.

References

1873 elections in the United Kingdom
1873 in England
19th century in Oxfordshire
December 1873 events
Elections in Oxford
By-elections to the Parliament of the United Kingdom in Oxfordshire constituencies
Unopposed ministerial by-elections to the Parliament of the United Kingdom in English constituencies